Genbox Family History is genealogy software for Microsoft Windows, developed by Thoughtful Creations. It functions as a database, a research planner and task organizer, a data analyzer, a chart producer, and a report writer.

Features
Genbox has evolved since its first release in 1993 as a DOS family tree charting application. It is now a complete genealogy software package, with project organisation features, support for data and media storage, source citations, and the production of complex and customizable charts and reports.

Some of its features include:

 Support for complex relationships among individuals, events, dates, places, and source citations: multiple personal names and identifiers, optionally linked to defining events, can be stored for individuals. Accurate relationships between each child and any number or type (biological, adoptive, foster, step, etc.) of parents can be stored. Any number of event types, attributes, and flags can be defined. Witnesses to events can be recorded, along with their roles.
 An unlimited number of event types and source types are supported with a sophisticated, multi-language template system. Event sentences and citation formats can be customized by the user.
 Reports can be generated in rtf and HTML format.
 Multimedia support for images, audio, and video
 Full Unicode support, GEDCOM import and export.

History
Genbox version 1.0 was originally released in 1992 as a DOS-based charting application.

Genbox version 2.0 was released in 1994.

Work began on the Windows version of Genbox Family History in August 1998

Windows release history
 Genbox 3.0: Feb 02, 2003. Included support for multiple names and parent relationships, witnesses, templates for event and source citations.
 Genbox 3.1.5: Oct 18, 2003
 Genbox 3.2: Jun 20, 2004
 Genbox 3.3: Oct 23, 2004
 Genbox 3.4: Apr 30, 2005
 Genbox 3.5: Jul 9, 2005
 Genbox 3.6: Oct 2, 2005
 Genbox 3.7: Feb 3, 2007
 Genbox 3.7.1: Nov 16, 2007

File format 
Genbox's underlying database engine is stored using the Access Database Engine (ACE/JET): the Genbox database can be opened in Microsoft Access.
 Format and structure of Genbox databases (.GDB) -Last Updated: 3 July 2006 for Version 3.6.5

References

External links

Genbox FAQ 

Windows-only genealogy software